Stan Meserve (born August 23, 1941 in Winslow, Maine) is a retired NASCAR Grand National driver who competed in one year of NASCAR racing.

Career
He earned a grand total $7,745 through his entire NASCAR racing career (which did not reach beyond 1968). Of the 31 races in which he participated in his career, Meserve had one top-ten finish in 4283 laps (2758.8 miles) of racing. He started and finished in 22nd place on average in his career and was a competitor at the 1968 Fireball 300. All of Meserve's races were done in a 1967 Dodge Charger vehicle. However, his later races for the Late Model Sportsman Series (which evolved into the Nationwide Series) and the Grand National North Series were done in a Chevrolet Chevelle vehicle and a Ford Granada vehicle. Meserve raced in the 1968 Daytona 500, dropping out after 34 laps.

After retiring from NASCAR using an underfunded 1967 Dodge Charger stock car, Meserve founded Distance Racing Products in 1983, a company that specialized in fabricating race cars and selling products to drivers throughout the Northeastern United States. He quickly retired from driving stock cars to become the technical director for the ACT Tour. He returned to driving full-time in 1998. Meserve is the only driver to win championships at Wiscasset Speedway, Oxford Plains Speedway, Speedway 95, and Unity Speedway.

As of 2007, Meserve was working at Dale Earnhardt Inc. and occasionally raced in Maine or on a short track in the Southern United States as a Pro Stock driver.

References
 Racing Reference
 Ultimate Racing History
 Race Database
 Maine Vintage Race Cars

1941 births
NASCAR drivers
People from Winslow, Maine
Living people
Racing drivers from Maine